Anne-Marie Sigouin is a Canadian politician, who serves on Montreal City Council as representative for the Saint-Paul–Émard–Saint-Henri-Ouest district in the borough of Le Sud-Ouest.

A member of the Projet Montréal political party, she was first elected in the 2013 municipal election and subsequently reelected in the 2017 election. She was also named by Mayor Valérie Plante as a designated councillor on the Ville-Marie borough council, which includes two city councillors from elsewhere in the city chosen by the mayor.

References

Montreal city councillors
Living people
People from Le Sud-Ouest
Mayors of places in Quebec
Women in Quebec politics
21st-century Canadian politicians
21st-century Canadian women politicians
Women municipal councillors in Canada
Year of birth missing (living people)